Integrability may refer to:

 Bronshtein-integrability (informal)
 Frobenius integrability
 Riemann-integrability
 Lebesgue-integrability; see Lebesgue integral
 Liouville-integrability
 Darboux-integrability

See also
 Integrable system (mathematics, physics)
 System integration (information technology)
 Interoperability (information technology)